"Sugar" is a song by American heavy metal band System of a Down. The song was taken from their debut studio album, System of a Down (1998). 

The song propelled the band into the front of the then current metal scene, giving them the opportunity to open for Slayer and Metallica, get second stage at Ozzfest, and getting them their first headlining tour. The video for the song was often played on MTV after release.

Music and lyrics 
"Sugar" has been described as "a spazzy, jazz-spattered noise rock freak-out". The song features rapped verses from lead singer Serj Tankian, along with death metal growls and shrieks, the latter two being signatures of the band's early sound. The verses of the song feature guitarist Daron Malakian on backing vocals. Later in the band's career, he would move on to be more of a co-lead vocalist (although he sang on demos of "Roulette" and DAM"). The ending of the song features the band speeding up from the original tempo.

"Sugar" is about the world's population's over use and reliance on drugs and other substances, as well as the predatory state of media like the news.

Music video 
The music video for "Sugar" shows the band playing on a stage, with an American flag intercut with images of public violence, hangings from the Holocaust, armies, footage of the Upshot-Knothole Grable nuclear test and footage from the German film Metropolis. The video was directed by Nathan Coxx.

The video, along with the band's next single, would be an MTV mainstay for a long time to come, much to the surprise of the band.

Reception 
The song was well received by critics and fans alike. It is regarded to be the best song from this album, and one of the band's best overall.

"Sugar" is System of a Down's 7th most streamed song on Spotify, having almost 180 million streams. The music video for the song also has over 128 million views on YouTube.

Track listing

Personnel 

System of a Down
 Serj Tankian – lead vocals, keyboards/samples
 Daron Malakian – guitars, background vocals
 Shavo Odadjian – bass
 John Dolmayan – drums

Production
 Produced by Rick Rubin with System of a Down
 Mixed by D. Sardy
 Engineered by Sylvia Massy
 Engineer/assistant engineer: Greg Fidelman
 Additional recording/finishing Touches: D. Sardy
 Assistant engineers: Sam Storey, Nick Raskulinecz
 Assistant mixdown engineers: James Saez, Greg Gordon, Andy Haller
 Second assistant mixdown engineer: Bryan Davis
 A&R direction: Dino Paredes, Sam Wick
 Management: Velvet Hammer Management, David Benveniste
 Recorded at Sound City, Van Nuys, California
 Vocals and additional recordings at Akademie Mathematique of Philosophical Sound Research, Hollywood, California
 Mixed at Record Plant Studios, Hollywood, California & Hollywood Sound, California
 Mastered by Vlado Meller at Sony Studios, New York City

 Live Tracks Produced by D. Sardy
 Live Tracks Mixed by D. Sardy
 Live Tracks Engineered by Doug Henderson
 Live Tracks Recorded at Irving Plaza, New York City, New York

Chart positions

Certifications

References 

System of a Down songs
1998 debut singles
Song recordings produced by Rick Rubin
1998 songs
Songs written by Serj Tankian
Nu metal songs